Critical Line was a contemporary art exhibition center that opened 5 May 2006 in the St. Helens section of Tacoma, Washington. The 1,800-foot redesigned gallery space specialized in installation art, video, performance, sound art, photography, and time-based work, and was devised to "allow for creative exploration, experimentation, and exhibition in a space where artists are encouraged to take creative risks." The gallery operated in partnership with its satellite project the Tollbooth Gallery, under the direction of Jared Pappas-Kelley alongside Michael Lent, and was one of four major projects of the nonprofit art organization ArtRod. These also included the contemporary art journal Toby Room, and the film and video series Don't Bite the Pavement.

In 2010 an online journal based on the Critical Line exhibition space was launched.

Past exhibitions 
 Found Space
 Keeping Score
 Nativity Artists
 New Works: Nicholas Nyland and Ellen Ito
 The End
 Critical Line Invitational

External links 
 www.ArtRod.org - The official website of the organisation.
 criticalline.co.uk - The gallery's online curatorial content

References

Buildings and structures in Tacoma, Washington
Art museums and galleries in Washington (state)
Tourist attractions in Tacoma, Washington
Art galleries established in 2006
2006 establishments in Washington (state)